The Third String may refer to:
 The Third String (1914 film), a silent British film
 The Third String (1932 film), a British film